The 1998 Heineken Open was a men's tennis tournament played on outdoor hard courts in Auckland, New Zealand that was part of the World Series of the 1998 ATP Tour. It was the 31st edition of the tournament and was held from 12 January through 18 January 1998. First-seeded Marcelo Ríos won the singles title.

Finals

Singles

 Marcelo Ríos defeated  Richard Fromberg, 4–6, 6–4, 7–6(7–3)
 It was Rios' 1st title of the year and the 7th of his career.

Doubles

 Patrick Galbraith /  Brett Steven defeated  Tom Nijssen /  Jeff Tarango, 6–4, 6–2
 It was Galbraith's only title of the year and the 34th of his career. It was Steven's only title of the year and the 9th of his career.

References

External links
 
 ATP – tournament profile
 ITF – tournament edition details

Heineken Open
Heineken
1998
January 1998 sports events in New Zealand